Tahir ibn Mohammad ibn Ibrahim (Bokhari) or Abu al-Qasim Muqane'i was a Persian physician in the 10th century. He was the disciple of Rhazes.
Abu Bakr Rabee Ibn Ahmad Al-Akhawyni Bokhari cited him in his book Hidayat al-Muta`allemin Fi al-Tibb as "Master":

References 

10th-century Iranian physicians